Events from the year 1788 in Spain

Incumbents
 Monarch – Charles IV

Events

 - Treaty of Aranjuez (1780)

Births

Deaths

References

 
1780s in Spain
Years of the 18th century in Spain